Janice Ann Sherry (born 14 June 1960) is a Canadian politician, who served in the Legislative Assembly of Prince Edward Island from 2007 to 2016. She represented the electoral district of Summerside-Wilmot as a member of the Liberal Party.

In January 2010, Sherry was appointed to the Executive Council of Prince Edward Island as Minister of Community Services, Seniors and Labour. Following the 2011 election, Sherry was moved to Minister of Environment, Energy and Forestry. She became Minister of Environment, Labour and Justice in November 2011, when Premier Robert Ghiz reduced the number of government departments. Sherry retained the portfolio when Wade MacLauchlan took over as premier in February 2015, but was dropped from cabinet following the 2015 election.

Sherry resigned as MLA for Summerside-Wilmot on August 1, 2016.

A native and resident of Summerside, Prince Edward Island, Sherry is a former business owner.

Electoral record

References 
 

Living people
Members of the Executive Council of Prince Edward Island
People from Summerside, Prince Edward Island
Prince Edward Island Liberal Party MLAs
Women MLAs in Prince Edward Island
21st-century Canadian politicians
21st-century Canadian women politicians
Women government ministers of Canada
1960 births